Bad Axe is a 2022 American documentary film directed by David Siev in his feature debut.

Synopsis
In Bad Axe, Michigan, David Siev's Asian-American family struggles to keep their local restaurant afloat amidst racial tensions and the COVID-19 pandemic.

Release
The film premiered at the South by Southwest Film Festival on March 14, 2022. In April, IFC Films acquired the distribution rights.

Reception
On the review aggregator website Rotten Tomatoes, 95% of 43 reviews are positive. At South by Southwest, the film won the Audience Award and received Special Jury Recognition for Exceptional Intimacy in Storytelling in the Documentary Feature Competition. The film made the short list for the Oscars short list for best documentary feature.

References

External links
 

2022 directorial debut films
American documentary films
Documentary films about Asian Americans
Documentary films about racism in the United States
Documentary films about the COVID-19 pandemic
Films set in 2020
Films set in Michigan
IFC Films films
2022 independent films
2022 documentary films
2020s English-language films
2020s American films